The red-eyed puffback (Dryoscopus senegalensis) is a species of bird in the family Malaconotidae.
It is found in Nigeria and Central Africa.
Its natural habitat is subtropical or tropical moist lowland forests.

References

red-eyed puffback
Birds of Central Africa
red-eyed puffback
Taxonomy articles created by Polbot